Beaver is an unincorporated community in Clallam County, Washington, United States on the Olympic Peninsula. The community lies between U.S. Route 101 and Lake Pleasant.

Geography
Beaver is located at  (48.057299, -124.347435), on U.S. Route 101 to the north of Forks, Washington. It is located just to the west of the boundary of the Olympic National Forest, on Lake Pleasant. A county park with a playground and boat launching facilities is located on Lake Pleasant. It is one of the wettest places in the contiguous U.S. with an annual precipitation value of 121 inches of rain.

Climate
The climate in this area has mild differences between highs and lows, and there is adequate rainfall year-round.  According to the Köppen Climate Classification system, Beaver has a marine west coast climate, abbreviated "Cfb" on climate maps.

References

Unincorporated communities in Clallam County, Washington
Unincorporated communities in Washington (state)